Agrinio (Greek: Αγρίνιο, Latin: Agrinium) is the largest city of the Aetolia-Acarnania regional unit of Greece and its largest municipality, with 106,053 inhabitants. It is the economical center of Aetolia-Acarnania, although its capital is the town of Mesolonghi. The settlement dates back to ancient times. In medieval times and until 1836, the city was known as Vrachori (Βραχώρι).

The majority of the local population was occupied for an important period of time in the tobacco industry, from the last decades of 19th till the end of the 20th century. Big tobacco companies were founded in the city, including the famous Papastratos, alongside Panagopoulos and Papapetrou. Agrinion is also agriculturally known for its production of Agrinion olives.

History

Antiquity 

According to mythology, the ancient city of Agrinio (situated in the area of Megali Chora) was built by king Agrios, son of Portheus and a great-grandson of Aetolos (king of Plevron and Calydon) around 1600-1100 BC.
The town, built near the banks of river Achelous (the natural border between Aetolia and Acarnania), was claimed by both states during ancient times. Agrinio became member of the Aetolian League and it was later destroyed by Cassander in 314 BC during the League's wars against the Kingdom of Macedonia.

Ottoman era 

The city reappears during the Ottoman period with the name Vrachori and apart from its Greek population it was also inhabited by many Turks (Muslims). In 1585 it was deserted during the revolt of Theodoros Migas. At the beginning of the 18th century it became the administrative centre of Aetolia-Acarnania (then as the sanjak of Karleli), depended on the imperial harems. Vrachori participated in the Greek Revolution and was temporarily liberated, by an army group led by Alexakis Vlachopoulos, on June 11, 1821. In August 1822, while Reşid Mehmed Pasha's (Kütahi) troops were marching towards Vrachori, its citizens decided to burn and evacuate their city, following the strategy of scorched earth. The deserted city was recaptured by the Turks. The city was finally included in the borders of the newborn Greek state permanently in 1832 with the Treaty of Constantinople (July 9, 1832) and was renamed after its ancient name, Agrinion.

Modern era 

In the years following the liberation, Agrinio went through an important growth and development, especially  at the end of the 19th century and the dawn of the 20th. After the Greco-Turkish War and the Asia Minor Catastrophe, many refugees from Asia Minor (western Turkey) arrived in the city and settled in the district of Agios Konstantinos. At the same period there was an important internal immigration to Agrinio from the whole Aetolia-Acarnania region, along with immigration from the areas of Epirus and Evrytania.

During the Interwar period, in spite of economical crisis, works of infrastructure took place in the city, like the paving of streets and the installation of electricity, and a water tower was installed in 1930. At the same time excavations revealed the ancient city of Agrinion. Growth and prosperity returned after World War II and the Greek Civil War. This growth was boosted by the building of two major hydroelectric dam installations at Kremasta and Kastraki, on the north of the city. The tobacco industry and olive tree cultivation became the main income sources of the city.

Climate 

On April 10, 2007, the city was struck by several earthquakes, with their epicenter located in the nearby Lake Trichonis on the southeast of the city. The first earthquake rumbled at around 2:20 AM, the second around 6:15 AM, three earthquakes shook at 10:13, 10:14 and 10:15 AM, and the last one at around 13:45 PM, they measured between 5.0 and 5.7 on the Richter scale. Residents reported that the buildings and its glasses were shaking and rumbling. Minor damages were reported without any victims.

On June 7, 2007, a low-pressure system, including heavy torrential rains, arrived from Southern and Central Europe stranding several people, and caused flooding in several buildings.

Transportation 
The main roads passing through Agrinio are the Greek National Road 5/E55 (Arta – Agrinio – Missolonghi) and the Greek National Road 38/E952 (Thermo – Agrinio – Karpenisi). Since 2009 the new Motorway 5 bypasses Agrinio to the west.

Agrinio's airport is located near the city, in the area of Dokimi. IATA code: AGQ, ICAO: LGAG. The airport hosts the Agrinion aeroclub Agrinion Aeroclub, website.

Municipality 

The extended municipality Agrinio was formed at the 2011 local government reform by the merger of the following 10 former municipalities, that became municipal units:
Agrinio
Angelokastro
Arakynthos
Makryneia
Neapoli
Panaitoliko
Parakampylia
Paravola
Stratos
Thestieis

The municipality has an area of 1229.330 km2, the municipal unit 162.728 km2.

Subdivisions 

The municipal unit (former municipality) of Agrinio consists of the following communities:
Agios Konstantinos
Agios Nikolaos Trichonidos
Agrinio
Dokimi
Kalyvia
Kamaroula
Skoutesiada

The city of Agrinio consists of the main city and the outlying villages Agios Ioannis Riganas, Akropotamos, Bouzi, Giannouzi, Diamanteika, Eleftheria, Lefka, Liagkaiika, Pyrgi, Schinos and Strongylaiika.

City Seal 
The city's official seal includes a characteristic moment of the ancient Greek mythology. More specifically, the seal depicts Hercules fighting the river-god Achelous. According to the myth, Hercules fought against the river-god for the sake of Diianira, the princess of Calydon, which both of them wanted as a wife. Despite Achelous' transformations, Hercules managed to win the battle and married the princess. According to Strabo, the myth symbolises the struggle of ancient Aetolians to control the river's power with embankments, by which the river was confined to its bed and thus the area gained large tracts of land for cultivation.

Historical population

Landmarks 

The Archaeological Museum of Agrinion, located in the city center, at 1-2 Diamantis Street. website
The neoclassical buildings of the tobacco storehouses Papastratos and Papapetrou, which date from the early 20th century.
The Papastrateio Municipal Park.
The Papastratios Municipal Library.
The Dimokratias Square, the main square of the city.
The remains of the Church of the Holy Trinity of Mavrika (8th-9th century), situated at the banks of lake Lysimachia.
Lakes Trichonida and Lysimachia.
The ancient city of Stratos.
The hydroelectric dams of Kremasta, Kastraki and Stratos.

Mayors 
 Georgios Baibas (1899–1907)
Andreas Panagopoulos (1925–1934 and 1951–1952)
 Dimitrios Votsis (1934–1941)
 Anastasios Panagopoulos (1964–1967)
 Stelios Tsitsimelis (1975–1986)
 Giannis Vainas (1986–1994)
 Thimios Sokos (1994–2006)
 Pavlos Moscholios (2006–2014)
 Georgios Papanastasiou (2014–present)

Famous citizens 

Stratos Apostolakis (1964) – footballer
Petros Michos (1959) – footballer
Kostas Chatzopoulos (1868–1920) – poet
Christos Garoufalis (1959) – writer
Katia Gerou – actress
Panagiotis Danglis (1853–1924) – general and politician
Filipos Darlas (1983) – footballer
Maria Dimadi (1907–1944) – resistance fighter
Petros Fyssoun (1933) – actor
Panos Kaponis (Caponis) (1947) – poet & writer
Christos Kapralos (1909–1993) – artist
Michalis Kousis (1953–2005) – Marathon runner
Aristidis Moschos (1930–2001) – musician
Pythagoras Papastamatiou (1930–1979) – writer
Thodoros (1931–2018) – sculptor
Evangelos Papastratos (1910–1988) – industrialist and benefactor of Agrinio
Loukia Pistiola – actress
Yiannis Yfantis (1949) – poet
 Kostis Maraveyas (1974) – singer and composer
Spiros and Eleni Tsiknia – Benefactors of Agrinio

Sporting teams 

Panetolikos FC – Super League Greece
Gymnastiki Etairia Agriniou (G.E.A.)
A.O. Agriniou
Ionikos 80 Volleyball
Nautikos Omilos
Asteras Agriniou
PAO Agriniou
Panagriniakos

Gallery

See also 
List of settlements in Aetolia-Acarnania
List of ancient Greek cities

References

External links 

Official site
Richard Stillwell, ed. Princeton Encyclopedia of Classical Sites, 1976: "Agrinion Greece"
www.agriniovoice.gr, local news
Agrinio City Guide

 
Cities in ancient Greece
Aetolia
Populated places in Aetolia-Acarnania